John James Taylor (10 December 1897 – 1971), often known as J. J. Taylor, was an English professional golfer. He won the Dutch Open in 1929.

Early life
Taylor was born in Northam, Devon, the son of Richard and Emma Jane Taylor who had been married in 1884. Despite being from the same small town in Devon, Taylor was unrelated to J. H. Taylor.

Golf career
Taylor was an assistant professional at Radyr Golf Club in south Wales when he played for the 1922 Findlater Shield. The following year he won the event, played at Bushey Hall, by 6 strokes. In 1924 he moved to Crews Hill in north London. He entered the Open Championship that year and scored 72 in the first qualifying round, tying third place of those playing at Formby. A 77 at Hoylake left him tied for 5th place in the qualifying. Scoring 89 and 81 in the first two rounds of the event, he withdrew. In early 1925 he moved again, to nearby Potters Bar. He played in the first Middlesex Professional Championship in 1925, tying with Fred Leach on 150. Taylor won the 36-hole replay by 155 to 158 to win the Championship. Taylor won the Middlesex Professional Championship again the following year with a score of 146, beating Fred Jewell by a stroke.

Taylor finished runner-up in the 1928 Belgian Open and won the Dutch Open in 1929. He reached the semi-finals of the News of the World Match Play in 1928 and 1936.

Professional wins
1923 Findlater Shield
1925 Middlesex Professional Championship
1926 Middlesex Professional Championship
1929 Dutch Open

Results in major championships

Note: Taylor only played in The Open Championship.

WD = withdrew
CUT = missed the half-way cut
"T" indicates a tie for a place

Team appearances
England–Scotland Professional Match (representing England): 1937 (winners)

References

English male golfers
People from Northam, Devon
1897 births
1971 deaths